Flaveria cronquistii is a rare Mexican plant species of Flaveria within the family Asteraceae. It has been found only in the States of Puebla and Oaxaca in central Mexico.

Flaveria cronquistii is a shrub up to 170 cm (68 inches or 5 2/3 feet) tall. One plant can produce numerous small flower heads in loose, branching arrays. Each head contains about 7 disc flowers but no ray flowers.

References 

cronquistii
Endemic flora of Mexico
Flora of Oaxaca
Flora of Puebla
Plants described in 1977